The New Adventures of Zorro is an American animated television series produced by Filmation in 1981.  The series, which has 13 episodes, is based on the fictional character created by Johnston McCulley.  It aired as part of The Tarzan/Lone Ranger/Zorro Adventure Hour.

This is the only series Filmation made in which they contracted an outside, third party animation studio (although the storyboards were created by Filmation themselves).  The series was outsourced to Tokyo Movie Shinsha in Japan.  All other series afterwards were animated internally by Filmation themselves. It was producer Norm Prescott's final series with Filmation, bringing to an end the famous 'rotating producers' wheel that made Filmation a household name. From Gilligan's Planet onwards, Lou Scheimer would handle production duties on his own.

Plot
Don Diego de la Vega is a young man of high social position from the town of Los Angeles, who fights against tyranny under a secret identity, Zorro.  He is helped by Tempest (originally "Tornado"), his black horse, and Miguel, a young swordsman (replacing the traditional mute servant Bernardo). Miguel wears a disguise very similar to Zorro’s (but with different colors and without a cape) and rides a Palomino.

Ramón, the captain of the garrison, is Zorro’s main foe.  Captain Ramón is helped in his task of capturing Zorro by González, a foolish sergeant who is friends with the De La Vega family.  Sergeant González was a character from the original Zorro story 'The Curse of Capistrano'.  He had been replaced by Sergeant Garcia on the Disney series.  The actor who voiced González, Don Diamond, played Sergeant Garcia's companion Corporal Reyes.

Voice cast
Henry Darrow as Zorro
Julio Medina as Miguel
Don Diamond as Gonzales
Eric Mason as Ramon
Christine Avila as Maria
Socorro Valdez as Lucia
Carlos Rivas as Don Alejandro
Ismael 'East' Carlo as Fray Gaspar

Episodes

Educational messages
Zorro showed the viewers information about California and the influence of Spanish language and culture in the region at the end of each episode. These kinds of educational messages were common in 1980's animated television series of Filmation. Other examples of this are the moral advice found in episodes of He-Man and the Masters of the Universe.

Merchandising
In 1981, toy manufacturer Gabriel released a line of Zorro action figures that tied in with Filmation's animated series. The characters included in the toy line were Zorro, Miguel, Captain Ramon, Sergeant Gonzalez, Tempest (horse) and Picaro (horse).

References

External links
 Zorro Productions, Inc.
 
 The New Adventures of Zorro on Hulu.com
 Pictures and information about The New Adventures of Zorro in Planete-Jeunesse

1981 American television series debuts
1981 American television series endings
1980s American animated television series
American children's animated action television series
American children's animated adventure television series
English-language television shows
Television series by Filmation
Television series by CBS Studios
Zorro television series
CBS original programming